Ashdod-Yam (lit. "Ashdod on the Sea" in Hebrew) is an archaeological site on the Mediterranean coast of Israel. It is located in the southern part of the modern city of Ashdod, and about 5 kilometres northwest of  where Ashdod stood in the time of the Philistines. Ashdod on the Sea and (inland) Ashdod were for most of their history two separate entities, connected though by close ties with each other. Most of the area has not been excavated yet and is covered by sand dunes.

History

The two towns, Ashdod and Ashdod-Yam, have been connected throughout their history. Despite the antiquity of the place, the name Ashdod-yam was applied to the site and adjacent town in October 1955, by Israel's Government Naming Committee.

Late Bronze Age

Iron Age
During the Iron Age the roles gradually reversed, and Ashdod-Yam, located south of Ashdod, overtook in importance the port at Tel Mor, located north of Ashdod. As one of the main five cities of the Philistine Pentapolis, Ashdod had great regional significance.

Ashdod-Yam is first mentioned in documents from the time of Sargon II of Assyria when in 713 BCE the Assyrian king speaks of having to depose a usurper who had taken over control of the city of Ashdod and had fortified three towns: Ashdod itself, Gath, and "Asdudimmu" (Ashdod-Yam).

Hellenistic through Byzantine period

When general Pompey restored to Ashdod its independence previously lost to the Hasmonean king John Hyrcanus, the city consisted of two twin towns, the regional center of Azotos Mesogeios or A. Hippenos (lit. "inland Ashdod" and "Ashdod of the horsemen" respectively), and Azotos Paralios (lit. "coastal Ashdod"; also written A. Paralus, Paralius)
 The town, under its Greek designation, appears in the Madaba Map of the 6th century.

This arrangement persisted throughout the Byzantine period, when the port town actually overshadowed in importance its former mother-city further inland: the bishops of Azotos present at the council of 325 and the council of Jerusalem in 536 seem to have resided in Azotos Paralios rather than in Azotos Mesogeios. Remains from Azotos Paralios of the Byzantine period, including a 1.500-year-old Greek dedication to a large church, were found over 2 km north of the inland Iron Age site. The inscription was discovered between two modern houses, about a mile from the coast. According to a medieval Christian Georgian calendar, a four-line Greek mosaic inscription dated back to "the 3rd indiction, year 292", which corresponds to the 6th century AD on the Gregorian calendar. The 6th-century Madaba Map shows both cities under their respective names. The prominence of Hellenised, then Christian Azotus continued until the 7th century, when it came under Muslim rule. The city was represented at the Council of Chalcedon by Heraclius of Azotus.

A chancel screen from a synagogue from the 6th century CE testifies to the existence of a Jewish community at Ashdod-Yam during the Byzantine period.

In November 2017, archaeologists discovered a church, later fully excavated and called “Church of the Deaconesses.”  An inscription was discovered between two modern houses, about a mile from the coast. According to a medieval Christian Georgian calendar, a four-line Greek mosaic inscription dated back to "the 3rd indiction, year 292", which corresponds to the 6th century AD on the Gregorian calendar. Archaeologists thought they could have found the remains of the Roman-Byzantine city of Ashdod-Yam. In 2021 excavations at the site of a Byzantine-era Christian basilica revealed "splendid" mosaics and tombs dug beneath the floors. The mosaics provide evidence of women serving as ministers and deacons of the church.  The burials included mass-graves of bodies covered in lime, believed to have been used to inter victims of the Plague of Justinian.

Early Muslim, Crusader, and Mamluk periods

A coastal fort was erected by the Umayyad Caliph Abd al-Malik, the builder of the Dome of the Rock, at or near the former Azotus Paralios, which was later reconstructed by the Fatimids and Crusaders.<ref name=Petersen>Andrew Petersen, The Towns of Palestine under Muslim Rule: AD 600-1600 ", BAR International Series 1381, 2005, pp. 90 -91</ref>

The medieval Arabic name of the port town was Mahuz Azdud, "harbour of Azdud", a very interesting combination between the by then already ancient Aramaic word for harbour, mahuz, and "Azdud", a return to a form much closer to the old Semitic name "Ashdod".

The fort of "Minat al-Qal'a" (lit. "the port with the castle" in Arabic) was probably built by the Umayyads and was reconstructed by the Fatimids and Crusaders. The initial purpose was to hold off the strong Byzantine navy and it constituted one link in a chain of Muslim coastal fortifications.

Documents from the Crusader period indicate that Ashdod and Ashdod-Yam belonged to the lordship of Ramla, and it appears probable that in 1169 the old Arab sea fort (Minat al-Qal'a) was given by Hugh, lord of Ramla, to his knight Nicolas de Beroard. From this period the fort is known as Castellum Beroart.

Ayyubid and Mamluk periods
The port stops being mentioned during the Ayyubid and Mamluk periods, making it likely that it was destroyed by the Muslims along with the other port cities, due to fears that they might again be used by Crusader invasions from the sea. With the destruction of the port city, its inland counterpart regains its importance.

Excavation
The Iron Age site was excavated by Jacob Kaplan from 1965 to 1968 on behalf of the Tel Aviv-Yafo Museum of Antiquities. Finds at the site include sections of city fortification walls and a glacis. Pottery found at the site suggests that the fortifications were built in the second half of the 8th century BCE and that a second phase of occupation occurred during the 7th century BCE when the site was no longer fortified.

The medieval fort has been most recently worked on by Dov Nachlieli and his team.

In 2012, a survey of Tel Ashdod was conducted by Paran Nir-Shims on behalf of the Israel Antiquities Authority (IAA).

 Further reading 
 H. Tadmor, Journal of Cuneiform Studies 22 (1958): pp. 70–80
 J. Kaplan, Israel Exploration Journal 19 (1969): pp. 137–149
 L. Y. Rahmani, Israel Exploration Journal 37 (1987): pp. 133–134.
 The New Encyclopedia of Archaeological Excavations in the Holy Land''. Jerusalem: The Israel Exploration Society and Carta: pp. 102–103

See also 
Ashdod, the historic twin city of Ashdod on the Sea; modern Ashdod now includes Ashdod on the Sea
Minat al-Qal'a, the Early Muslim castle at Ashdod on the Sea

References

Ancient sites in Israel
Ashdod
Medieval sites in Israel
Former populated places in Israel